Giulio Savelli (27 September 1941 – 12 May 2020) was an Italian politician and publisher.

Biography
Born in Rome, Italy, on 27 September 1941, Savelli co-founded the publishing house  alongside Giuseppe Paolo Samonà in 1963. Samonà left the business in 1968, and Savelli ran Samonà e Savelli on his own. Savelli retired from publishing in 1976, leaving Samonà e Savelli to an editorial collective. The publishing company closed in 1982. 

Savelli was elected to the Chamber of Deputies as a member of Forza Italia. He sat on the Legislature XIII, which met between 1996 and 2001.  

Savelli was married to the journalist . He died in Rome on 12 May 2020.

References

1941 births
2020 deaths
Forza Italia politicians
Deputies of Legislature XIII of Italy
Italian publishers (people)
20th-century publishers (people)
Politicians from Rome
Italian company founders
20th-century Italian businesspeople
Businesspeople from Rome